El Gaucho y el diablo (The Gaucho and the Devil) is a 1952 Argentine black-and-white Western drama film directed by Ernesto Remani, based on a script by José María Fernández Unsain, who adapted it from the 1891 short story "The Bottle Imp", by Robert Louis Stevenson. The film stars Juan José Míguez, Elisa Galvé, Francisco Martínez Allende, and Elina Colomer.

Plot
A rancher makes a pact with the devil to find happiness and love.

Cast

 Juan José Míguez
 Elisa Galvé
 Francisco Martínez Allende
 Elina Colomer
 Raúl del Valle
 Víctor Ferrari
 César Fiaschi
 Audón López
 Cristina Pall
 Blanca del Prado

Production
Production of El gaucho y el diablo commenced in October 1950.

Reception
La Razón said of the film: "A failed attempt...the lack of laboratories for developing the film, a technical aspect that had to be completed abroad, had a decisive influence. This resulted in a series of defects in the editing and an appreciable lack of unity in the layout."

References

External links
 

1952 films
1950s Spanish-language films
Argentine black-and-white films
Fictional gauchos
Films about gauchos
The Devil in film
1950s Argentine films